Conflans-sur-Loing (literally Conflans on Loing) is a commune in the Loiret department in north-central France.

See also
 Communes of the Loiret department

References

Conflanssurloing